The Codex Martínez Compañón (c.1782–1785), is a manuscript edited in nine volumes by the bishop of Trujillo, Peru, made by Baltasar Jaime Martínez Compañón, containing 1,411 watercolours and 20 musical scores documenting life in his diocese. This work was sent to Charles IV of Spain, who included it in the Royal Library in 1803. The musical examples in the bishop's text were probably written out by Pedro José Solis, maestro de capilla of Trujillo Cathedral from 1781 to 1823.

The 1,411 illustrations
The watercolour illustrations contain pictures of the life of the Indians, clothing, customs, and also extensive natural history.

External links to galleries
selection of thumbnails of trees

The 20 musical examples

The pieces are mainly short, 2 or 3 minutes each. The order here follows the K617 recording rather than Folio order:
1 Cachua: Al Nacimiento de Christo Nuestro Señor.
2 Tonada: La Brugita, de Guamachuco - i.e. Huamachuco, site of Augustinian missions. 
3 Tonada: El Congo. - a 'negro' slave song, reflecting the use of African slaves in the workforce from 1660 
4 Tonada: El Tuppamaro de Caxamarca. 
5 Tonada del Chimo - i.e. of the Chimú culture, the only surviving song in the extinct Mochica language
6 Dance: Baile del Chimo. Folio 179 (instrumental)
7 Tonada: El diamante, de Chachapoias. Folio 187 
8 Tonada: La Lata - "the can". 
9 Tonada: La Selosa, del pueblo de Lambayeque - "the jealous woman".
10 Tonada: El Conejo. 
11 Tonada: El Huicho, de Chachapoyas. 
12 Dance: Bayle de danzantes con pifano y tamboril. (Instrumental) 
13 Tonada: La Donosa.
14 Cachuyta de la montaña: "El Vuen Querer" - montaña indicates the lowland east of the mountains. 
15 Cachua a duo y a quatro: Al Nacimiento de Christo Nuestro Señor.
16 Lanchas para baylar. Folio 186 - instrumental, the term lancha literally "flat boat, launch for dancing" indicates a dance for fiddle and continuo in quick 3/4 time, and is almost unique to the Codex
17 Tonada: El Tupamaro de Caxamarca.
18 Tonadilla: El Palomo, del pueblo de Lambayeque. 
19 Cachua Serranita: El Huicho Nuebo, a Nuestra Señora del Carmen, de la ciudad de Trujillo. Otusco
20 Cachua: La Despedida, de Guamachuco - a cachua for leave-taking.

Recordings
 selection - Al uso de nuestra tierra (In the style of our land) Música Temprana, Netherlands. Voice of Lyrics 2001, nla. 
 complete - Codex Martinez Companon, Capilla de Indias, Tiziana Palmiero, Conductor, K617. This is the first recording of the complete 20 pieces. 
 2 selections - on Patricia Petibon recital Nouveau Monde Marcon DGG, 2012
 complete - "Bailes, Tonadas & Cachuas", Songs and dances from Trujillo, Peru (18th century), Música Temprana, director: Adrián Rodríguez Van der Spoel, 2013. Deuss Music. COBRA0036.
 selection - "Son de los diablos" Tonadas afro-hispanas del Peru - DIANA BARONI & Sapukai - Alpha Productions, Les Chants de la Terre 2003 - Alpha 507

References

External links
 Manuscript online at the National Library of Madrid. Nine volumes of watercolours
 Volume II, index des partitions 

Baroque music manuscript sources
History of Peru
Watercolor paintings